Nicasius Bernaerts, Monsù Nicasio or simply Nicasius(1620, Antwerp – 1678, Paris) was a Flemish painter of animals, hunting pieces and flowers who had an international career in Italy and Paris.  He worked for the French court and provided tapestry designs to the Gobelins Manufactory.

Life
Bernaerts was born in Antwerp.  He studied painting under Frans Snyders, the leading animal painter in Antwerp.  After completing his training, he travelled to Italy.  Here he was known as 'Monsù Nicasio'. His work was collected in Italy by Ferdinando II de' Medici, Grand Duke of Tuscany.

Bernaerts subsequently travelled to France where he worked in Paris for a number of years around 1643.  He returned to Antwerp where he became a master of the Guild of Saint Luke in 1654.

In 1659 he moved to Paris. He was admitted into the Royal Academy of Painting and Sculpture in Paris in 1663. He was employed by the French king Louis XIV to make paintings of all the new animals added to his menagerie at Versailles. 
 In 1673 Bernaerts provided 46 studies of 52 species of animals. Some of these paintings were subsequently used to decorate the pavilion at the menagerie.

He subsequently entered the service of the royal administration and provided studies and animal paintings for the needs of the Gobelins Manufactory and royal real estate office (Garde-Meuble de la Couronne).

Bernaerts was later in life reduced to poverty as a result of alcoholism. He died in poverty in 1678.

The French animal painter Alexandre-François Desportes was his pupil.

Work
Nicasius Bernaerts painted animals, hunting pieces, including game pieces, and still lifes.

Bernaerts is known for his extensive and violent depictions of animals in combat, in particular of predatory birds.  These were directly inspired by similar works by his master Frans Snyders who pioneered this genre in Flanders.  Bernaerts worked on such scenes before and possibly during the period he was employed at the Gobelins tapestry manufactory.

In his paintings of the animals from the menagerie at Versailles, Bernaerts presented his subjects with a pedagogic objective.  The animals are depicted in quiet poses, their bodies almost always in profile, their eyes often turned to the viewer, as in portraits of humans. This posing of the animal allows the viewer to better observe the anatomy of each animal. Each creature is set against a classicizing landscape background. Bernaerts' paintings are now the best sources for identifying the original animal population of the Versailles menagerie as they were inventoried by Nicolas Bailly in his Inventaire des tableaux du roy rédigé entre 1709 et 1710 (first published by Fernand Engerand, Paris, 1899).

There is uncertainty regarding the actual authorship of the numerous unsigned oil-sketches that came to the Louvre during the French Revolution and were listed as 'A.F. Desportes' originally and then distributed as such about a century ago to French provincial museums. An old Gobelins-inventory, which was rediscovered in 1967, shows that a number of these works were produced by the generation of artist preceding Desportes such as Nicasius Bernaerts. It is assumed that among the works now given to Bernaerts at the Louvre a number must be authentic, most probably the nicely done, rather antiquated portraits of different poultry races.

Bernaerts also painted portraits of pets as shown in the Portrait of Tambon, dog of the Duke of Vendôme (1865, Auctioned at Christie's on 28–29 September 2015 in Paris, lot 386).

References

External links

1608 births
1678 deaths
Flemish Baroque painters
Flemish still life painters
Painters from Antwerp